The 1999 Thai Premier League consisted of 12 teams. The bottom club would be relegated to the Thailand Division 1 League. The club that came 11th would play in a relegation / promotion match against the club that came second in the Thailand Division 1 League

Defending Champions Sinthana would enter the next edition of the Asian Club Championship.

The league was also known as the Caltex Premier League.

Member clubs
Bangkok Bank
Bangkok Bank of Commerce (''promoted from Division 1)
BEC Tero Sasana
Sinthana
Krung Thai Bank
Osotsapa M-150
Port Authority of Thailand
Bangkok Metropolitan Administration
Royal Thai Air Force
Royal Thai Army
Thai Farmers Bank
TOT

Final league table

Promotion and relegation Playoff 

The club that came 11th would play in a relegation / promotion match against the runner-up in the Thailand Division 1 League

† Royal Thai Army relegated to the Thailand Division 1 League and Royal Thai Navy promoted to the Thai Premier League in next season.

Queen's Cup

The 27th edition of the Queen's Cup was won by guest side Hanyang University of South Korea. This would be their 7th and final victory in the competition.

Thailand FA Cup

Bangkok Bank won and retained the trophy for the second year running, by defeating Osotsapa 2-1. This was Bangkok Bank's 4th victory in the competition.

Asian Representation

  After failing in the 1998–99 Asian Cup Winners Cup the previous year, Sinthana would progress to the third round, and group stage of the 1999–2000 Asian Club Championship. On their way to the group stage, Sinthana would gain victories over GD Lam Pak of Macau and Singapore Armed Forces FC. In the group stage they would once again come up against Kashima Antlers and be out played. Jubilo Iwata and Suwon Samsung Bluewings would also make up the group.
 Bangkok Bank reached the semi-finals of the 1999–2000 Asian Cup Winners Cup, where they were beaten by Shimizu S-Pulse of Japan on penalties in a game played in Chiang Mai. Bangkok Bank would compose themselves to win the 3rd/4th place match in beating Navbakhor Namangan FC of Uzbekistan.

Annual awards

Coach of the Year 
 Piyapong Piew-on - Royal Thai Air Force

Top scorer 
 Sutee Suksomkit - 13 Goals Thai Farmers Bank

Champions
The league champion was Royal Thai Air Force. It was the team's second title.

References

Thailand 1999 RSSSF

External links
Official Website

Thai League 1 seasons
Thailand
Thailand
1